Melaleuca hamata is a plant in the myrtle family, Myrtaceae and is endemic to the south-west of Western Australia. It grows to a large, dense shrub with broombrush foliage and profuse pale yellow flowers in late spring.

Description 

The flowers are a shade of yellow, through cream to white. The stamens, which give the flowers their colour, are arranged in five bundles around the flower with 3 to 8 stamens per bundle.

Taxonomy and naming
This species was first formally described in 1844 by Henry Barron Fielding and Charles Austin Gardner in Sertum Plantarum: or drawings and descriptions of rare and undescribed plants from the author's herbarium . The specific epithet (hamata) is from the Latin word hamus meaning "a hook" or "angle" referring to the curved ends of the leaves.

Distribution and habitat
Melaleuca hamata occurs in and between the districts of Mount Gibson, Nyabing, Leinster and Munglinup in the Avon Wheatbelt, Coolgardie, Esperance Plains, Gascoyne, Geraldton Sandplains, Great Victoria Desert, Jarrah Forest, Little Sandy Desert, Mallee, Murchison and Yalgoo biogeographic regions. It grows on a wide range of soils in a range of vegetation associations and is the most common brushwood species in the wheatbelt.

Conservation status
This melaleuca is listed as "not threatened" by the Government of Western Australia Department of Parks and Wildlife.

Uses

Agriculture
In field trials for evaluating different species melaleucas as a source of brushwood, Melaleuca hamata was proven to be the species best suited to the heavy loams that dominate large areas of Western Australia.

References

hamata
Myrtales of Australia
Rosids of Western Australia
Plants described in 1844
Endemic flora of Western Australia